Roseanne Vela (born December 18, 1952) is an American model, singer and songwriter.

Early life, education and modeling career
Roseanne Vela was born on December 18, 1952 in Galveston, Texas. Her family later moved to Arkansas, where she attended the University of Arkansas. While studying art and music, Vela also began modeling. She married the Arkansas born musician, Jimmy Roberts, but he died of cancer shortly after. Following this, Vela moved to New York where her modeling career took off and she graced the covers of magazines including Vogue and Newsweek from 1975 onwards, and appeared in numerous television commercials.

Vela has also appeared in several films including Heaven's Gate (as the "beautiful girl" with whom Kris Kristofferson's character falls in love during Harvard's graduation ceremony scene), The Two Jakes with Jack Nicholson and Inside Edge opposite Michael Madsen.

Music
Turning her attention to music, Vela built a home recording studio for herself and signed a recording contract with A&M Records. She released her debut album Zazu in 1986. The entire album was written or co-written by Vela and was produced by Gary Katz. It is also notable for the fact that it included contributions from both Donald Fagen and Walter Becker (two of Vela's musical heroes) six years after they had disbanded their group Steely Dan. Though the album was critically acclaimed, it went largely unnoticed in the U.S. It fared better in Europe and a single from the album (Magic Smile) was a Top 30 hit in the UK Singles Chart.  The album itself peaked at #20 in the UK Albums Chart and was certified silver by the BPI in March 1987. Further singles "Interlude" and "Fool's Paradise" met with less success.

It has been reported that Vela recorded a second album entitled Sun Upon the Altar, but the album remains unreleased.

Following Zazu, Vela did not release any further recordings but has since become a backing vocalist for other musicians including Electric Light Orchestra on its 2001 album Zoom. Vela also performed a few shows with the band and was in a relationship with ELO's frontman Jeff Lynne for seven years. Vela co-wrote "A Woman Like That" with Lynne for the 1998 movie Still Crazy.

See also
 Zoom Tour Live

References

External links
 
 
 

1952 births
Living people
American women singer-songwriters
A&M Records artists
People from Galveston, Texas
Female models from Texas
Electric Light Orchestra members
Singer-songwriters from Texas